Prem Saran Satsangi is the eighth and current Sant Satguru of Radhasoami Faith, Dayalbagh. He holds the Emeritus Chair from the East of the Integrated East-West Forum at The Science of Consciousness Conferences since 2012. He is the chairman of Advisory Committee on Education, Dayalbagh Educational Institute.

Birth

He was born on the campus of Banaras Hindu University, Varanasi on the day of Indian festival of Holi on 9 March 1937, to  Krishna Kumar, a Professor of Botany at Agriculture College, Banaras Hindu University and Bhakt Saheli.

Education and early career
He studied electrical engineering at the Banaras Hindu University At present Indian Institute of Technology (BHU) Varanasi and graduated in 1957.

In 1960 he accepted a scholarship at Michigan State University  where he received his M.S. in Electrical engineering in 1961. The USAID extended his fellowship for Ph.D., but Satsangi declined the offer and returned to India in July 1961. He got an appointment as Reader in Electrical Engineering at MBM Engineering College and was appointed to the faculty in 1964.

He, thereafter joined the Indian Institute of Technology Delhi in 1964,. In the initial years, he taught basic network theory (analysis and synthesis), control theory and electric traction courses. He served as Assistant Professor for 8 years, Associate Professor in 1972 and Professor of Electrical engineering in 1973.

He was selected for a Canadian Commonwealth Research Fellowship award. He secured admission as a doctoral candidate at the University of Waterloo with research supervisor Jack B. Ellis in the research field of socio-economic systems.

In the summer of 1970, he went to the University of Waterloo as a post doctoral fellow for three months for joint research assignment with the Department of Systems design engineering and Man-environment studies. During the period, he completed his Ph.D. dissertation in the form of relevant papers. He also attended a short summer course at MIT on transport systems.

Dayalbagh (1993–present)

He left IIT Delhi in May 1993 to join the Dayalbagh Educational Institute as its director. During the 1990s, he was involved in education and research in intelligent systems engineering applications to large and complex systems by invoking soft computing techniques and published several papers and produced a number of doctoral theses.

He held the office of Director of Dayalbagh Educational Institute for almost nine years. His primary duties involved academic administration, although he continued participating in systems science research and practice.

He is involved in the research of systemic education and experiences related to material, energy, information, mind, intellect, emotion and the science of spiritual consciousness transcending the one in ancient India and the recent advances in neurophysiology and cognitive psychology.

Spiritualism
He was initiated into Radhasoami Faith on 13 February 1958. He became the member of Radhasoami Satsang Sabha in 1993.  In May 2003, Satsangi was unanimously acclaimed as the 8th Revered Leader of the Radhasoami Faith. Under his guidance, Radhasoami Satsang Sabha, initiated the Murar Declaration  on 13 June 2010, for forging unity among different Radhasoami communities.

He believes that the theory of spiritual systems is fully consistent with the latest theory of everything of the Physical Universe.

Family
Satsangi married on 11 November 1958 (Deepavali) to P.Bn. Satyavati and they had 2 daughters, Prem Pyari and Dayal Pyari, who are both married.

Research papers
Satsangi has published 90 research papers and has attended several national and international conferences. His major contributions are in the field of Applied systems engineering including socio-economic systems such as transportation and energy systems.

See also
 List of University of Waterloo people

References 

1937 births
Living people
20th-century Indian physicists
21st-century Indian physicists
Consciousness researchers and theorists
Indian cosmologists
Quantum mind
Quantum physicists
Mathematical physicists
Indian Institute of Technology (BHU) Varanasi alumni